Hottah Lake is the sixth largest lake in the Northwest Territories, Canada.

Plane crash
On 8 November 1972, a medical evacuation aircraft piloted by Marten Hartwell crashed on a hillside near the lake. Hartwell broke both legs while the nurse, Judy Hill, and a pregnant Inuk woman named Neemee Nulliayok died. David Pisurayak Kootook also survived the crash but died after 20 days. Kootook was instrumental in the pair's survival but unlike Hartwell would not eat the flesh of the dead nurse.

Legacy
When the Mars Curiosity rover discovered solid evidence of an ancient streambed on Mars from a pile of cemented smooth rocks (conglomerates), the project managers named one of the two rock outcrop sites Hottah (the other is named Link) after the Lake.

See also
 List of lakes in the Northwest Territories
 Hottah terrane

References

External links
 Image of "Hottah" on Mars, the outcrop named after the lake.

Lakes of the Northwest Territories